The Campbell Fighting Camels basketball team is the men's basketball team that represent the Campbell University in Buies Creek, North Carolina. The school's team currently competes in the Big South Conference. The team's most recent, and only appearance in the NCAA Division I men's basketball tournament was in 1992. After struggling for several seasons, the Fighting Camels finally broke through in the 2009–2010 season. Campbell tied for first in the regular season Atlantic Sun standings. However, their bid for an NCAA Tournament bid came up short, as they were eliminated in the Atlantic Sun Conference tournament.

Postseason

NCAA tournament results
The Fighting Camels have appeared in one NCAA tournament. The Camels lost their only NCAA tournament game, 56–82, to eventual 1992 National Champion Duke.

NIT results
The Fighting Camels have appeared in one National Invitation Tournament. Their combined record is 0–1.

CIT results
The Fighting Camels have appeared in one CollegeInsider.com Postseason Tournament (CIT). Their record is 2–1.

CBI results
The Fighting Camels have appeared in the College Basketball Invitational (CBI) one time. Their record is 2–1.

NAIA tournament results
The Fighting Camels have appeared in the NAIA tournament two times. Their combined record is 4–2.

Home venues

Primary
Carter Gymnasium (1953–2008)
John W. Pope, Jr. Convocation Center (2008–present)

Other
 Cumberland County Civic Center in Fayetteville, North Carolina (116 games; 1968–1997) 
 Raleigh Civic Center in Raleigh, North Carolina (19 games; 1978–1982)
 Crown Coliseum in Fayetteville, North Carolina (4 games; 1997–1999)
 Harnett Central HS (6 games; 1977–1980)
 South Johnston HS (2 games; 1976–1977)
 Cape Fear HS (1 game; 1969–1970)

Camels in the NBA

 Chris Clemons
 George Lehmann

Camels in international professional basketball

Eric Griffin (born 1990), basketball player in the Israeli Basketball Premier League

Retired numbers 
On January 16, 2020, the Fighting Camels retired former player Chris Clemons' number 3.

Coaches

Season records
 Records incomplete before 1951

References

External links